West Plains Regional Airport  is a city-owned, public-use airport located 10 nautical miles (12 mi, 19 km) northwest of the central business district of West Plains, a city in Howell County, Missouri, United States. It was formerly known as West Plains Municipal Airport. This airport is included in the National Plan of Integrated Airport Systems for 2011–2015, which categorized it as a general aviation facility.

Although many U.S. airports use the same three-letter location identifier for the FAA and IATA, this facility is assigned UNO by the FAA but has no designation from the IATA.

Facilities and aircraft 
West Plains Regional Airport covers an area of 210 acres (85 ha) at an elevation of 1,228 feet (374 m) above mean sea level. It has one runway designated 18/36 with an asphalt surface measuring 5,101 by 75 feet (1,555 x 23 m).

For the 12-month period ending 30 June 2011, the airport had 23,860 aircraft operations, an average of 65 per day: 99% general aviation and 1% air taxi. At that time there were 26 aircraft based at this airport: 69% single-engine, 12% multi-engine, 15% helicopter, and 4% ultralight.

References

External links 
 Airport page at City of West Plains website
  at Missouri DOT airport directory
 Aerial image as of February 1995 from USGS The National Map
 

Airports in Missouri
Buildings and structures in Howell County, Missouri